Marco Antonio Oneto Zúñiga (born 3 June 1982) is a Chilean retired handball player. He retired from club handball in 2018 but still plays for the chilean national team.

Honours
 FC Barcelona
 1 EHF Champions League (2010–11)
 1 Liga ASOBAL (2010–11)
 2 Copa del Rey (2008–09), (2009–10)
 2 Liga Pirineos (2009–10), (2010–11)
 1 Supercopa de España (2009–10)
 1 Copa ASOBAL (2009–10)

References

External links
FCB profile

1982 births
Living people
Chilean male handball players
Liga ASOBAL players
FC Barcelona Handbol players
Handball-Bundesliga players
Handball players at the 2003 Pan American Games
Handball players at the 2011 Pan American Games
Handball players at the 2015 Pan American Games
Handball players at the 2019 Pan American Games
Pan American Games silver medalists for Chile
Pan American Games bronze medalists for Chile
Pan American Games medalists in handball
Expatriate handball players in Poland
Chilean expatriate sportspeople in Spain
Chilean expatriate sportspeople in Poland
Chilean expatriate sportspeople in Germany
Chilean expatriate sportspeople in Portugal
Wisła Płock (handball) players
Veszprém KC players
South American Games bronze medalists for Chile
South American Games medalists in handball
Competitors at the 2018 South American Games
Sportspeople from Viña del Mar
Medalists at the 2015 Pan American Games
Medalists at the 2019 Pan American Games
Medalists at the 2011 Pan American Games
20th-century Chilean people
21st-century Chilean people